This list includes notable people who were born in, or lived in Northern Ireland.

A–G

 Gerry Adams politician
 Max Adrian actor
 Mark Allen snooker player
 Gerry Anderson television presenter
 Willie Anderson Ireland Rugby Union International
 Kevin Baird bassist for Two Door Cinema Club
 Colin Bateman actor, director and writer
 David Bates physicist
 Andrea Begley singer
 Philomena Begley country music singer
 Eric Bell guitarist for Them and Thin Lizzy
 John Stewart Bell physicist
 Jocelyn Bell Burnell astrophysicist
 George Best footballer
 Rory Best rugby player 
 Colin Blakely actor
 Danny Blanchflower footballer
 Robert Bradford politician
 Kenneth Branagh actor and director
Anna Burns novelist
 Jake Burns founder of and singer in the punk band Stiff Little Fingers
 Amanda Burton actress
 Stephen Boyd actor
 Vivian Campbell rock guitarist for Def Leppard
 Peter Canavan Gaelic footballer
 Joshua Cargill Drag queen
 Adam Carroll racing driver
 Ciarán Carson poet
 Edward Carson politician and judge
 Frank Carson comedian
Andrea Catherwood journalist and television presenter
 Darren Clarke golfer
 George Clarke filmmaker
 Clare Crockett Roman Catholic religious sister and actress
 Una O'Connor actress
 Phil Coulter songwriter, pianist and music producer, arranger and director
 Nadine Coyle singer for Girls Aloud
 Sean Coyle radio presenter
 James Craig  loyalist paramilitary criminal
 Steven Davis footballer
 John Daly television presenter
 George Dawson politician
 Martin Dillon author and journalist
 Richard Dormer actor
 Brendan Dolan darts player
Laura Donnelly actress
 Jamie Dornan actor, model, musician 
 Roma Downey actress
 Adrian Dunbar actor
 Hugo Duncan singer and broadcaster
 Joey Dunlop motorcycle racer
 Robert Dunlop motorcycle racer
 Garth Ennis comics writer
 St. John Greer Ervine writer
 Jonny Evans footballer
Michelle Fairley Game of Thrones actress
Harry Ferguson inventor; developed modern agricultural tractor and first four-wheel drive formula one car; first person to build and fly his own plane in Ireland
 Dave Finlay professional wrestler; associated with World Wrestling Entertainment
 Brendan Foley writer, director
Arlene Foster former First Minister of Northern Ireland 
 Fra Fee actor
 Carl Frampton boxer
 Brian Friel playwright
 Jackie Fullerton television presenter
 Bronagh Gallagher actress and singer
 Mike Gibson rugby player
Sue Gray UK civil servant
Daryl Gurney darts player

H–M

 John Hallam actor
 Sam Halliday guitarist for Two Door Cinema Club
 David Healy footballer
 Holly Hamilton journalist and television presenter
 Neil Hannon musician, The Divine Comedy
 Seamus Heaney poet
 Paul Henry artist
 Alex Higgins snooker player
 Conleth Hill Game of Thrones actor 
 Ciarán Hinds actor
 David Holmes composer, DJ and musician
 Eamonn Holmes television presenter
 Geraldine Hughes actress
 John Hume recipient of Nobel Peace Prize
 David Humphreys rugby player
 Gloria Hunniford  television presenter
 Eddie Irvine racing driver
 Saoirse-Monica Jackson actress
 Oliver Jeffers artist and author
 Pat Jennings footballer
 Jimeoin actor and comedian
 Marie Jones playwright
 Patrick J. Jones painter
Valene Kane actress
 John Kelly author and broadcaster
 Brian Kennedy musician
 Patrick Kielty television presenter
 Jack Kyle  rugby player
 Kyle Lafferty footballer
 Christine Lampard television presenter
 Joseph Larmor physicist
 John Lavery painter
 Michael Legge actor
 Neil Lennon footballer
 C. S. Lewis writer
 Helen Lewis choreographer and pioneer of modern dance
 Gary Lightbody singer for Snow Patrol
 John Linehan entertainer
 Jane Loughrey journalist for UTV
 John Lynch actor
 Susan Lynch actress
 Bernard MacLaverty writer
 Patrick Magee actor
 Simone Magill professional footballer
 Derek Mahon poet
 Paula Malcomson actress
 Dominick Martin musician, DJ (a.k.a. Calibre)
 Linda Martin singer
 Brian Mawhinney (PC) former British politician and chairman of the Football League in England
 Paddy Mayne soldier and explorer
 Mary McAleese President of Ireland
 Willie John McBride rugby player, captained Ireland and British Lions
 Christopher McCafferty Club Promoter, DJ
 Graeme McDowell golfer Lions

 Ian McElhinney actor
 Leah McFall singer-songwriter
 Damian McGinty singer and actor
 Lisa McGee playwright and screenwriter
 Matt McGinn (born 1978) singer-songwriter
 Eimear McGeown flautist
 Alister McGrath Christian theologian
 Medbh McGuckian poet
 Martin McGuinness politician
 Rory McIlroy golfer
 Gerry McKenna MRIA biologist
 Robert McKenzie actor
 David McKittrick journalist
 Ralph McLean television presenter
 Paul McLoone  radio producer and lead singer The Undertones
 James McParland Pinkerton detective
 Peter McParland footballer
 Gerard McSorley actor
 Ian Mitchell musician for the Bay City Rollers
 Brian Moore novelist
 Gary Mooreformer blues rock guitarist for Thin Lizzy
 Colin Morgan actor
 Van Morrison singer
 William Mulholland civil engineer
Hercules MulliganIrish-American tailor and spy during the American Revolutionary War. He was a member of the Sons of Liberty.
 Colin Murray radio DJ
 Ruby Murray – pop chart star

N–Z

 Kristian Nairn actor 
 Liam Neeson actor
 Sam Neill actor
 James Nesbitt actor
 Alanna Nihell boxer
 Stephen Nolan radio and television presenter
 Martin O'Neill footballer and football manager
Michelle O'Neill politician
 Jamie-Lee O'Donnell actress
 Ian Paisley preacher and politician
 Rhonda Paisley author
 Norman Parke MMA-Fighter
 Glenn Patterson novelist
 Mary Peters athlete
 William Pirrie – co-designed the RMS Titanic
 Patricia Quinn actress
 Ronan Rafferty golfer
 Stephen Rea actor
 Brendan Rodgers football manager
 Zöe Salmon television presenter
 Feargal Sharkey lead singer The Undertones
 Dean Shiels footballer
 Victor Sloan photographer and artist
 Michael Smiley comic actor
 Joe Swail  snooker player
Bronágh Taggart actress
 Dennis Taylor snooker player
 William Thomson, 1st Baron Kelvin mathematical physicist and engineer
 Austin Trevor actor
 Alex Trimble singer and guitarist for Two Door Cinema Club
 Andrew Trimble rugby player
 Juliet Turner singer-songwriter
 John Watson Formula One driver
 Jayne Wisener actress
Tim Wheeler lead singer, guitarist and songwriter of the band Ash
 Norman Whiteside footballer
 Tony Wright musician and singer/songwriter known as VerseChorusVerse

References

 Northern Ireland
 Northern Ireland
 
Northern Ireland